Kevin Patrick Kavanagh,  (born September 27, 1932) is a Canadian businessman.

Born in Brandon, Manitoba, Kavanagh received a Bachelor of Commerce degree from the University of Manitoba in 1953. After graduating he started working for The Great-West Life Assurance Company in 1953. He worked his way up the ranks becoming president and CEO of Great-West Life from 1979 to 1990. From 1986 to 1992, he was president and CEO of Great-West Lifeco. He was Chancellor of Brandon University from 1996 to 2002.

In 2002, he was made a Member of the Order of Canada. In 2009, he was made a Member of the Order of Manitoba.

References

1932 births
Living people
Businesspeople from Brandon, Manitoba
Canadian chief executives
Canadian university and college chancellors
Members of the Order of Canada
Members of the Order of Manitoba
University of Manitoba alumni